Jean Lenoir pseudonym for Jean Bernard Daniel Neuburger (26 February 1891 – 19 January 1976) was a French songwriter, whose work included chansons and romantic light film songs.

Lenoir was born in Paris. His most famous song, for which he wrote both melody and lyrics, was Parlez-moi d'amour (1930). It was composed for the cabaret Chez les Borgia and was recorded by Lucienne Boyer. By 1970, it had already been performed by more than 167 artists, including: Duke Ellington, Ray Charles, Maurice Chevalier, Ray Conniff and Barbra Streisand.

Lenoir died in Suresnes, aged 84.

Selected filmography
 Alone (1931)
 My Aunt from Honfleur (1931)
 Moonlight (1932)
 The Three Musketeers (1932)
 The Crisis is Over (1934)
 Miquette (1934)
 Gold in the Street (1934)
 Second Bureau (1935)
 Veille d'armes (1935)
 Women's Prison (1938)
 The Chess Player (1938)
 Dorothy Looks for Love (1945)
 Night Warning (1946)
 Midnight in Paris (2011) (Instrumental)

References

1891 births
1976 deaths
French male composers
20th-century French composers
20th-century French male musicians